Rokan River is a river in Riau province, central-eastern Sumatra, Indonesia, about 1100 km northwest of the capital Jakarta.

Hydrology
The river sourced from the Barisan Mountains in the west, and drained north-east-ward along Rokan Hulu Regency and Rokan Hilir Regency with estuarine located near the port town of Bagansiapiapi draining the water to Malacca Strait.

Tributaries include the Rokan-kiri River, Rokan-kanan River, Kumu River.

Geography
The river flows in the central area of Sumatra with predominantly tropical rainforest climate (designated as Af in the Köppen-Geiger climate classification). The annual average temperature in the area is 23 °C. The warmest month is March, when the average temperature is around 24 °C, and the coldest is January, at 22 °C. The average annual rainfall is 3766 mm. The wettest month is November, with an average of 336 mm rainfall, and the driest is July, with 113 mm rainfall.

See also
List of rivers of Indonesia
List of rivers of Sumatra

References

Rivers of Riau
Rivers of Indonesia